While You Were Sleeping is a 2017 South Korean television series starring Lee Jong-suk, Bae Suzy, Jung Hae-in, and Lee Sang-yeob. Consisting of sixteen chapters distributed over 16 episodes, this legal drama-fantasy television series centers on the lives on three young adults—a field reporter, a prosecutor, and a police officer—who have acquired the ability to foresee future events through their dreams, after saving each other many years ago.

The series is directed by Oh Choong-hwan and written by Park Hye-ryun. It aired on SBS from September 27 to November 16, 2017 on Wednesdays and Thursdays at the 22:00 (KST) time slot. The drama completed filming and editing before airing the pilot episode. The drama is available on online streaming services such as Netflix, Viki, KOCOWA and Viu. iQIYI also broadcasts the drama.

Synopsis
While You Were Sleeping is a combination of the romance, legal drama and fantasy genres, focusing on the tale of three young adults who have acquired the ability to see the future through their dreams: field reporter Nam Hong-joo (Bae Suzy), rookie prosecutor Jung Jae-chan (Lee Jong-suk), and police officer Han Woo-tak (Jung Hae-in). Some of these dreams show crimes that Jae-chan has to investigate and others show disastrous events that one or more of them will have to endure. Troubled by these dreams, the trio collaborate with each other to prevent their ominous dreams from turning into reality and to defeat their archenemy, the corrupt lawyer Lee Yoo-beom (Lee Sang-yeob).

Episodes

Cast

Main 
 Bae Suzy as Nam Hong-joo 남홍주  (a.k.a. Bamtori)
 Shin Yi-joon as young Nam Hong-joo 
 Born in 1988, Hong-joo is a 29-year-old journalist and field reporter who has the power of precognition (the ability to see events in the future), which takes effect while dreaming. She was once a tomboyish girl nicknamed "Bamtori" (Korean: 밤톨이; English: Chestnut) who aspires to become a baseball player. Since she was a child, Hong-joo has been haunted by seeing the deaths of other people in her dreams, one of which is the untimely death of her father, Nam Chul-doo, at the hands of a runaway soldier who also killed Jae-chan's father. She first met Jae-chan when both their fathers' funerals were jointly conducted on the same date in the same funeral hall. By saving Jae-chan from drowning, she had inadvertently made Jae-chan acquire the same ability that she has. Due to her short haircut and tomboyish characteristics, many people, including the reporters of the runaway soldier case and Jae-chan mistook her as a boy.

 Now that she is fatherless, Hong-joo began dreaming of the impending deaths of her mother, Yoon Moon-sun, and herself: the former happening due to an accident she gets into and the latter due to her occupation as a field reporter. Unfortunately, like all the other dreams, she does not know when the deaths will happen; she can only guess. In her attempt to stop her dreams from becoming reality, she leaves her job and helps her mother in running a samgyeopsal restaurant. Nevertheless, she regains her resolve in doing her job as a field reporter with Jae-chan to support her in preventing their dreams from coming true. She later in the series falls in love with Jae-chan and begins dating him.

 Lee Jong-suk as Jung Jae-chan 정재찬 
 Nam Da-reum as young Jung Jae-chan
A 29-year-old rookie prosecutor. Jae-chan was the son of Jung Il-seung, a police chief officer who was murdered by the same runaway soldier who killed Hong-joo's father. Back in his adolescent years, he was a carefree boy with no worries about his studies. After reconciling with his father, he became a changed teenager and aimed to work as a prosecutor. It was also at this age that he acquired from Hong-joo the ability to see the future through dreams, when Hong-joo saved him from drowning in a lake while preventing police officer Choi Dam-dong, the runaway soldier's older brother, from committing suicide.

Despite appearing cold and lacking a sense of humor, Jae-chan is still foolish and funny in some aspects. Since the first appearance of his future-seeing dreams, he will do everything he can to prevent them from coming true. He falls in love with Hong-joo after days of going out with each other, without knowing or recognising that she was "Bamtori" , his childhood acquaintance who also lost her father to the runaway soldier (his lack of recognition was due to him remembering Hong-joo as a boy from her tomboyish mannerisms and short, boy-like haircut). He was born in April 1988, and his blood type is B. Despite all the chaos he somehow managed to fall for Nam hong and is very protective towards her.

 Jung Hae-in as Han Woo-tak 한우탁 
A 29-year-old police officer who was the topnotcher in his class of aspiring policemen. Woo-tak is considered to be a handsome, intelligent, and able-bodied police officer. Although he exemplifies the ideal policeman, he keeps a secret that can jeopardize his career in the police: he is actually suffering from color blindness but an error in the assessment made his condition undetected.

Woo-tak was destined, without him knowing, to die in a car accident that Yoo-beom will cause on a snowy Valentine's Day after he delivered Yoon Moon-sun's cellphone which she left at her restaurant. Thanks to Jae-chan, who intercepted Hong-joo's car which Yoo-beom was driving, he was saved from his supposed death and acquired from him the ability to see future events through dreams. Together with Jae-chan and Hong-joo, they work together to keep their bad dreams from coming true. As the trio went on with their lives, Woo-tak began having an affection for Hong-joo, although he kept his feelings concealed, sensing that Hong-joo and Jae-chan are developing feelings for each other. His birthday was in September 1988, and his blood type is O.

 Lee Sang-yeob as Lee Yoo-beom 이유범 
 Yeo Hoe-hyun as young Lee Yoo-beom
A 34-year-old successful and famous prosecutor turned lawyer who does not hold any attachments. Yoo-beom was Jae-chan's private tutor when Jae-chan was in his adolescence. He coaxed Jae-chan into falsifying his report cards so that they can gain money from Jae-chan's father and buy a motorcycle. With Yoo-beom driving the new motorcycle, they get into an accident and he leaves Jae-chan behind to fend for himself, an incident which made Jae-chan to dislike him.

As a former prosecutor, Yoo-beom dared to falsify evidence just to finish his cases. As a lawyer, he works in Haekwang Law Firm, taking on any case that brings him a lot of money and going to whatever lengths to achieve an outcome he desires, such as fabricating evidence or manipulating testimonies even if he knows if his clients are truly guilty or innocent. He even went as far as to murder Ha Joo-an, the true culprit of the IV drip serial murders to cover up the fact that he fabricated evidence that wrongly convicted a doctor for perpertuating the 19 killings. Yoo-beom was eventually found guilty of murder and fabrication of evidence and sentenced to incarceration for life.

He was Hong-joo's boyfriend because of a blind date. However, they broke up after Jae-chan saved her from the accident that night. Yoo-beom's birthday was 20 November 1983.

Supporting

Division 3 
 Kim Won-hae as Choi Dam-dong
 Lee Jae-kyun as young Dam-dong
A police officer turned detective/inspector who works for Jae-chan in the Prosecution Office. Choi Dam-dong was the older brother of Choi Guk-hyun, the runaway soldier who killed Dam-dong's chief and Jae-chan father, Jung Il-seung, and Hong-joo's father, Nam Chul-doo. During his younger years as a police officer, he attempted to commit suicide by drowning himself in a lake out of the shame he felt for Guk-hyun's crimes. Before he completely drowns, Jae-chan and Hong-joo saves him and convinces him to move on with his life. From that moment on, he wished he could meet them once again in the future.

Now an old detective, Inspector Choi's skills as a former policeman are still in action, particularly when it comes to crime scenes. He once worked for ex-prosecutor Yoo-beom, though he was unaware of Yoo-beom's fraudulent schemes until when he began working for Jae-chan. He began supporting the unknowing Jae-chan in his investigations and gives him helpful advice. He also talks formally to Jae-chan even though he is much older than him. It is also revealed in the latter episodes of While You Were Sleeping that he had also acquired the ability to see the future through dreams, apparently from Hong-joo and Jae-chan. 
 Ko Sung-hee as Shin Hee-min 신희민 
A female prosecutor with a charming and friendly appearance. Prosecutor Shin was Jae-chan's colleague when they were in college, but she holds a higher position than Jae-chan in the prosecution office, next to their superiors.  She also has a high success rate at prosecuting criminals, though she sometimes finds it hard to accept her own mistakes, especially her failure in Kang Dae-hee's poisoning case.
 Min Sung-wook as Lee Ji-kwang
A senior prosecutor who became close and supportive to Jae-chan. He is willing to cover up for Jae-chan and to let him borrow his personal things, even his own car. He began to secretly date fellow prosecutor Son Woo-joo. Later on, their secret affair was accidentally revealed to their co-workers when he wore by mistake Prosecutor Son's lipstick which he inadvertently switched with his lip balm.
 Bae Hae-sun as Son Woo-joo
Another senior prosecutor who was a single mother unbeknown to her co-workers. She became close to Prosecutor Lee and ended up being married to him.
 Lee Ki-young as Park Dae-young
Chief of the Prosecution Officer Division 3 who is very conscious about his division's reputation and performance. He has the same name as a mobile phone thief whom he indicted ten years ago when he was still a prosecutor.
 Park Jin-joo as Moon Hyang-mi
Jae-chan's assisting officer who likes handsome men but can get easily turned off.
 Son San as Min Jung-ha
 Lee Bong-ryun as Go Pil-suk

People around Jung Jae-chan
 Shin Jae-ha as Jung Seung-won, Jae-chan's 19-year-old younger brother who was born in 1998. He is the boyfriend of a famous pianist named Park So-yoon
 Go Woo-rim as young Jung Seung-won

People around Nam Hong-joo 
 Hwang Young-hee as Yoon Moon-sun, Hong-joo's widowed mother and the late Nam Chul-doo's wife; a samgyeopsal restaurant owner. She was supposed to die due to exhaustion to compensate Han Woo-tak's death (due to the fact that his death happened after he delivered her left phone and she was also Hong-joo's only family) and Hong-joo's hospital bills. It is thanks to Jae-chan's intervention that averted this horrible fate and she became a caring motherly figure to Jae-chan, Woo-tak and Seung-won.

Others 
 Lee Yoo-joon as Oh Kyung-han
a police officer along with Han Woo-tak; he sensed that Woo-tak has color blindness but kept the secret to himself to prevent Woo-tak from getting discharged
 Oh Eui-shik as Bong Du-hyun (SBC reporter; Hong-joo's senior)
 Huh Jun-suk as Dong-kyun (SBC reporter)
 Pyo Ye-jin as Cha Yeo-jung (Police officer who has a crush on Han Woo-tak)
 Yoo In-soo as Seung-won's classmate

Special appearances 

 Kim So-hyun as Park So-yoon (Ep. 2–8, 16, 32)
a young pianist who suffers from her father Jun-mo's abusiveness; Seung-won's girlfriend
Jang So-yeon as Do Geum-sook, So-yoon's mother (Ep. 3–8)
So-yoon's mother who is fearful and submissive to her abusive husband Jun-mo
 Um Hyo-sup as Park Jun-mo, So-yoon's father (Ep. 3–8)
So-yoon's abusive father; Lawyer Lee Yoo-beom's regular client
 Choi Won-young as Nam Chul-doo, Hong-joo's father (Ep. 3–4)
Hong-joo's deceased father; a bus driver who was killed by the runaway soldier who also killed Jung Il-seung
 Jang Hyun-sung as Jung Il-seung, Jae-chan's father (Ep. 1, 5–8)
Jae-chan's deceased father; the former police chief officer of Il-yoo Police Station before he was killed by the runaway soldier (his subordinate Choi Dam-dong's younger brother) who also killed Nam Chul-doo
Hong Kyung as Choi Wook-hyun (Ep. 3, 6, 29, 31)
a soldier who deserted from the army and during the escape, he used a rifle to kill Jae-chan's father and detonated a grenade on a bus, causing both himself and Hong-joo's father to die in the explosion. It is later revealed that he was the younger brother of Choi Dam-dong. 
Lee Jung-eun as Jae-chan's mother (Ep. 5–6)
 Kim Da-ye as Kang Cho-hee (Ep. 10–13, 15, 32)
Dae-hee's younger sister, an employee in a coffee shop. Her brother Dae-hee had killed her second brother Byung-hee for insurance. She was originally set to be murdered by Dae-hee for her insurance as well but survived the murderous rampage with Hong-joo and Woo-tak's help
 Kang Ki-young as Kang Dae-hee (Ep. 9–13)
Cho-hee's older brother; a chicken restaurant owner who killed his younger brother for his insurance; one of Lawyer Lee Yoo-beom's clients; initially acquitted of killing his brother, he was once again arrested and after a retrial, he receives a life sentence for his brother's murder in the end
 Kang Shin-hyo as College student (Ep. 10)
 Shim Wan-joon as Bearded man
 Shin Eun-jung as Kim Joo-young, judge (Ep. 11–12)
 Lee Do-gyeom as Myung Dae-gu (Ep. 13, 24–32)
Seung-won's classmate and son of Myung Yi-suk, a doctor who was falsely accused as the culprit of an intravenous drip serial killing of 19 hospital patients. Even after his father was convicted and sentenced to life imprisonment and after his father's death by suicide, Dae-gu sought to help his father prove his innocence, and he harboured a strong sense of hatred towards Yoo-beom ever since
 Baek Sung-hyun as Do Hak-young (Ep. 13–17)
Woo-tak's high school roommate and internet installer who was falsely accused to be the culprit behind Yoo Soo-kyung's sudden death
 Cha Jung-won as Yoo Soo-kyung (Ep. 13–16)
a nationally renowned athlete in archery who is very much loved by the people around her because of her virtuousness and generosity. She died when an attack of fainting spells due to otolithiasis caused her to collapse and injure her head, leading to severe cerebral hemorrhage.
 Jeon Kuk-hwan as Yoo Man-ho (Ep. 15–18, 32)
a skilled marksman who is suffering from pancreatic cancer and is in terminal condition. He is Soo-kyung's father, becoming one of Lawyer Lee Yoo-beom's clients for her daughter's case.
 Go Woo-rim as Chan-ho (Ep. 19–21, 32)
Prosecutor Son's son who suffers from a chronic kidney failure
 Moon Yong-suk as Lee Hwan (Ep. 19–24)
Professor Moon Tae-min's teaching assistant and an organ donor to seven patients (including Chan-ho). He was one of the victims of Professor Moon's abusiveness, from which he got his injured arm. He was secretly killed by Professor Moon after he attempted to reveal Professor Moon's wrongdoings during a book launching activity.
 Kim Ki-cheon as Hwan's father (Ep. 21–24, 32)
 Ryu Tae-ho as Moon Tae-min (Ep. 21–24)
a seemingly benevolent professor and writer but is abusive to his students and subordinates in reality. He secretly killed Lee Hwan after a book launching ceremony. He is one of Lawyer Lee Yoo-beom's clients.
 Yoon Kyun-sang as couple in meadow (Ep. 21)
 Lee Sung-kyung as couple in meadow (Ep. 21)
 Lee Ju-seok as the Judge (Ep. 21–22)
 Yoon Yong-hyun as Park Dae-young, a mobile thief (Ep. 25–26)
a mailman turned thief whose nine-year-old daughter became paralyzed after a car accident. With her daughter needing constant care at home, he abandoned his job and resorted to stealing mobile phones. He has the same name as the prosecutor who sent him behind bars. Her daughter died ten years ago while he was in jail.
Dae-young continued his crime even after he was out of jail and stole Ha Joo-an's phone in the process. He copied Joo-an's files in a flash drive before giving it to Jae-chan for investigation.
 Lee Jae-won as Jo Yoon-pyo (Ep. 25–26)
Ha Joo-an's accomplice who knew about Joo-an's crime. He was asked to retrieve the phone which contained the photos of Joo-an's 19 victims. He was, then, killed by Joo-an after he got caught by the police.
 Lee Na-ra as Ha Joo-an (Ep. 28–29) 
the real culprit of a seriously dreaded intravenous drip serial killing of 19 hospital patients. She was a bed-ridden patient suffering from Crohn’s disease. Out of her intense animosity towards her fellow patients who were already about to be discharged, she injected her first 11 victims with Vecaron. She killed her remaining eight targets in the same manner after the arrest of the doctor Myung Yi-suk, who was first assumed as the culprit of the crime. She also kept photos of her victims in her phone, which was stolen by the thief Park Dae-young and the contents revealed to Jae-chan and his team. During her appearances in the show, Joo-an had never shown any tinge of remorse for her actions. She was killed by Lawyer Lee Yoo-beom, who threw her off the building and let her fell to her death after she attempted to murder Hong-joo.
 Son Byong-ho as Lawyer Ko Sung-ho, Representative of Haekwang Law Firm (Ep. 29–31)

Production 
 This is the second collaboration between singer-actress Bae Suzy and scriptwriter Park Hye-ryun after working together in the 2011 hit series Dream High. It is also the third time that Park and Lee Jong-suk have worked together after I Can Hear Your Voice and Pinocchio.
 First script reading took place on January 20, 2017 in Mokdong, Seoul, South Korea.
 While You Were Sleeping is a fully pre-produced TV series. Filming began in February 2017, while Lee Jong-suk joined filming on March 2. Filming wrapped up on July 27 at Wonbang set in Paju, after five months of filming.
 This was the second drama where Shin Jae-ha and Kim So-hyun appeared together, after KBS's 3-episode Page Turner.

Original soundtrack

Part 1

Part 2

Part 3

Part 4

Part 5

Part 6

Part 7

Part 8

Part 9

Part 10

Part 11

Part 12

Part 13

Charted songs

Ratings 
 In the table below, the blue numbers represent the lowest ratings and the red numbers represent the highest ratings.
 NR denotes that the drama did not rank in the top 20 daily programs on that date

Awards and nominations

Notes

References

External links
  
 
 

Seoul Broadcasting System television dramas
2017 South Korean television series debuts
2017 South Korean television series endings
Korean-language television shows
Television series produced in Seoul
South Korean fantasy television series
South Korean legal television series
South Korean romance television series
South Korean pre-produced television series
Science fantasy television series
Television shows written by Park Hye-ryun
Television shows about dreams
Television series by IHQ (company)